Teratoscincus mesriensis is a species of gecko, a lizard in the family Sphaerodactylidae. The species is endemic to Iran.

Etymology
The specific name, mesriensis, is a Latinized toponymic adjective, meaning "from Mesr", the village near which the species was discovered.

Geographic range
T. mesriensis is found in Isfahan Province, Iran.

Description
T. mesriensis is a medium-sized gecko.

References

Further reading
Nazarov, Roman A.; Radjabizadeh, Mehdi; Poyarkov, Nikolay A., Jr.; Ananjeva, Natalia B.; Melnikov, Daniel A.; Rastegar-Pouyani, Eskandar (2017). "A New of Frog-Eyed Gecko, Genus Teratoscincus Strauch, 1863 (Squamata: Sauria: Sphaerodactylidae), from Central Iran". Russian Journal of Herpetology 24 (4): 291–310. (Teratoscincus mesriensis, new species).

Teratoscincus
Endemic fauna of Iran
Reptiles of Iran
Reptiles described in 2017